Indonesia–North Korea relations refers to bilateral relations between Indonesia and North Korea. The two countries established diplomatic relations in 1961. Indonesia is one of the very few countries that still maintain cordial relations with North Korea, despite international sanctions and isolation applied upon North Korea concerning its human rights abuses, nuclear missile program and Indonesia's stronger engagement and partnership with South Korea.

Both nations share a relationship that dates back to the Sukarno and Kim Il-sung era in the 1960s. Indonesia has an embassy in Pyongyang, while North Korea has an embassy in Jakarta. Both nations are members of the Non-Aligned Movement.

According to a 2017 BBC World Service Poll, 46% of Indonesians view North Korea's influence negatively, with only 17% expressing a positive view.

History

During President Kim Il-sung's visit to Indonesia in 1965, President Sukarno was showing the North Korean leader around the Bogor Botanical Gardens when the latter was smitten by an orchid from Makassar. President Sukarno promptly named the flower Kimilsungia and appointed it as the symbol of the eternal friendship between the two countries. The Kimilsungia violet orchid, has become an integral part of the ever-present state-sponsored propaganda that surrounds the late leader.

Pyongyang in 1975 and introduced to North Korea for the first time in April 1977, Kim Il-sung's 65th birthday. The Kim Il Sung orchid has become a powerful and beautiful symbol in North Korea, which until recently has often been prominently featured in state-made flower arrangements.

However, diplomatic relations were cut off until 1972 following the overthrown of the Sukarno regime. Under the leadership of Suharto, Indonesia quietly moved closer to the United States and South Korea, even though Jakarta remained the headquarters of the Non-Aligned Movement. Despite that lean, Indonesia never formally severed ties with North Korea.

Indonesia's historic ties to North Korea were reaffirmed under president Megawati Sukarnoputri, the daughter of Sukarno who visited Pyongyang in 2002 to build relations with then North Korean leader Kim Jong-il in the spirit of the friendship their fathers enjoyed.

In 2002, the president of the Presidium of the Supreme People's Assembly of the Democratic People's Republic of Korea, Kim Yong-nam, met president Megawati Sukarnoputri. In 2005 president Kim Yong-nam also visited Indonesia to attend the Asian-African Conference Commemorative. In May 2012, president Kim Yong-nam, paid an official visit to Jakarta. The visit prompted Indonesian Human Rights and Democracy activists to call on President Susilo Bambang Yudhoyono to help push for democratisation and respect for human rights in the isolated state.

Indonesia has invited North Korean leader Kim Jong-un to attend the opening ceremony of the 2018 Asian Games in Jakarta in August following a similar invitation to South Korean President Moon Jae-in, officials said. At the ceremony, athletes from South Korea and North Korea paraded under one flag, which is "Korea." Tens of athlete representatives from the two countries were seen wearing white and light blue uniform, which is a combination of colors found in the Korean Unification Flag.

In 2020, President Joko Widodo sent a basket of flowers to North Korea's leader Kim Jong-un to mark the 72nd anniversary of the Democratic People's Republic of Korea (DPRK). It added that President Jokowi had also reiterated his willingness to bolster cooperation between the two countries “for peace and progress in the region and beyond.” North Korean leader Kim Jong Un sent a congratulatory message to President Jokowi to mark Indonesia's 75th anniversary on 17 August this 2020.

Contemporary relations

Cultural relations 
Indonesia still maintains its relations with North Korea despite North Korea's human-rights abuses and nuclear program that is threatening South Korea and Japan, two nations that share a far closer politic relation, economic interest, and strategic partnership with Indonesia. Indonesia still continues to engage North Korea as it believes in dialogue, and maintains that there is no point in isolation.

Indonesian annual participation in the Kimilsungia Flower Festival and biennial at the April Spring Friendship Art Festival (ASFAF) and International Film Festival (PIFF) in Pyongyang and joint activities between the Indonesian Embassy in Pyongyang and the Committee for Cultural Relations with Foreign Countries (CCRFC), the Association for Friendship and Foreign Affairs North Korea also enriches bilateral relations between the two countries. Additionally, North Korea also sent 2 (two) diplomats to attend the 11th International Training Course for Mid-Career Diplomats organised by the Indonesian Ministry of Education and Training Centre in Jakarta on 20 October to 3 November 2013.

Economic relations 
The North Korean government operated the Pyongyang restaurant in Jakarta, serving North Korean cuisine, promoting North Korea as well as being a source of foreign currency for North Korean government. The Pyongyang restaurant had chefs, cooks, and waitresses from North Korea. The restaurant was closed after the death of Kim Jong Un's stepbrother.

In 2012, through the World Food Programme, Indonesian government provided assistance worth US$2 million which was realised in the form of 1,465 tonnes of palm oil. It is used as a supply of foodstuffs enriched with vitamins and minerals for later distributed directly to the Korean people, especially the most vulnerable, such as breastfeeding mothers and children in North Korea.

In the period of January – October 2014 the volume of trade between the two countries recorded only 2.8 million US dollars (down 82.24 percent over the same period in 2013). In this regard, planned for the Indonesian economy team's visit to the DPRK and vice versa, which is expected to increase the volume of trade, and can further increase the bilateral relations between Indonesia – DPRK in the future.

In 2015, North Korea's imports to Indonesia amounted to US$1.41 million. The most widely imported is vegetable residue which is 42 percent with a total import of US$597 thousand. Additionally, North Korea also imported soap from Indonesia worth US$600 thousand.

According to Trade Ministry data, the total trade volume between the two countries amounted to US$3.26 million in 2019, up from the previous year's total value of $964,000. Indonesia and North Korea total trade reaches US$342.9 thousand, while trade relations since 2014 to 2019 has made Indonesia imbalance of trade significantly in non-oil and gas export import.

References 

North Korea
Bilateral relations of North Korea